Baritius cerdai is a moth of the family Erebidae. It was described by Hervé de Toulgoët in 2001. It is found in French Guiana.

References

Phaegopterina
Moths described in 2001